A List of Slovak films of the 2010s.

References

External links
 Slovenská filmová databáza

2010s
Lists of 2010s films
Films